Kansa is a Siouan language of the Dhegihan group once spoken by the Kaw people of Oklahoma. Vice President Charles Curtis spoke Kansa as a child. The last mother-tongue speaker, Ralph Pepper, died in June 1982.

Classification
Kansa is a Dhegiha Siouan language, a broader category containing other languages such as Quapaw, Omaha, Ponca and Osage. This group of languages falls under Mississippi Valley Siouan, which is grouped under the largest category of The Siouan Language Family.

History
The speakers of Kansa, known as the Kaw people, lived together with the Siouan-speakers in a united nation known as the Dhegiha Siouan group. This group was originally situated north of the Ohio River and east of the Mississippi River and then moved west down the Ohio River. After this migration, the Dhegiha Siouan group split into five subgroups or tribes that were known as the Poncas, Osages, Omahas, Quapaws and the Kaws. Later on the Kaw migrated west of Missouri river and were called the "People of the Southwind." The languages of the 5 tribes originating from the single Dhegiha group are extremely similar and have been considered as dialects of each other.

Geographic distribution
The language was only spoken in Kansas and is no longer spoken natively since all of the speakers have died. Members of the tribe now use English, but some are able to understand certain phrases or words in the language.  There are, however, language revitalization efforts ongoing.

Scholarship and resources

Pioneering anthropologist and linguist James Owen Dorsey collected 604 Kansa words in the 1880s and also made about 25,000 entries in a Kansa-English dictionary which has never been published. Dorsey also collected 24 myths, historical accounts, and personal letters from nine Kansa speakers.

In 1974, linguist Robert L. Rankin met Walter Kekahbah (d. 1979), Ralph Pepper (d. 1982), and Maud McCauley Rowe (d. 1977), the last surviving native speakers of Kansa.  Rankin made extensive recordings of all three, especially Rowe, and his work over the next 31 years documented the language and helped the Kaw Nation to develop language learning materials.

Phonology 
Kansa has 29 consonants and 8 vowels.

/ɛ/ is phonetically open-mid, whereas /o/ is phonetically close-mid. Additionally, /a/ and /o/ can also be pronounced as [ə] and [u] respectively.

Grammar

Nouns
Kansa does not mark nouns for number or gender. The number of a particular noun can be determined from the verb, an article or from context. For example, the word  could be translated to English as "squirrel" or "squirrels" depending on context, in the sentence ,, it must be a single squirrel because of the article .

Verbs
Kansa is a SOV language and the verbs are inflected based on the person and number of their subjects and objects. For example, in the sentence , the object ,, comes before the verb .

Kansa does not have verb tenses.

Orthography

Vocabulary
The Kansa language has a lot of words similar to the other tribes originated from the Dhegiha Siouan group. The following table lists compares cognates in Kansa and Osage:

Language revitalization 
As of 2012, the Kaw Nation offers online language learning for Kansa second language speakers.

The 2nd Annual Dhegiha Gathering in 2012 brought Kansa, Quapaw, Osage, Omaha and Ponca speakers together to share best practices in language revitalization.

References

External links

 Kansa language at the Kaw Nation (extensive online language study resources and texts)
 Kaw Indian Language (Kansa, Kanza)
 OLAC resources in and about the Kansa language
 English to Kansa Dictionary
 Kansa Talking Dictionary
 Kanza Language for Families and Communities
 Examining the Development of Kaw Writing

Kaw tribe
Indigenous languages of Oklahoma
Western Siouan languages
Languages extinct in the 1980s
Native American language revitalization